Wudang Sword is a body of Chinese straight sword (jian) techniques—famous in China—encompassed by the Wudang quan or internal martial arts.

The oldest reputable accounts of Wudang Sword begin with Grandmaster Sung Wei-I around the turn of the 20th century. Sung taught Wudang Sword to Li Jing Lin and a few others. He learned the art from a Daoist named Zhang Ye-He, who was the 8th generation lineage holder.

Sung also learned the martial art of Bagua from the kung fu brother of Dong Haichuan, the supposed creator of Baguazhang.

Disciples of Li Jing Lin who learned the Wudang Sword were Huang Yuan Xiou, Meng Xiao-Feng, who taught current head Grandmaster in China Ma Jie, and Yang Kui-Shan, who taught modern day Grandmaster Qian Timing. Both Ma Jie and Qian Timing taught Chang Wu-Na and Lu Mei-hui, the current masters of the 13th generation.
Li Jing Lin also taught his art to many of his friends and colleagues such as Sun Lu  Tang and Fu Chen Song.

Inside disciples of Fu Chen Song who learned the Wudang Sword were his son, Fu Wing Fay, who taught it to Bow-sim Mark and to his children, including Victor ShengLung Fu, Fu WenLung and Fu MeiLan.

See also
Taijijian
Wudang Sword at Five Immortals Temple

References

Neijia
Chinese swordsmanship